John Carmichael Jenkins (1809–1855) was an American plantation owner, medical doctor and horticulturalist in the Antebellum South.

Biography

Early life
John Carmichael Jenkins was born on December 13, 1809 at the Windsor Forge Mansion in Churchtown, Pennsylvania. His father was Robert Jenkins (1769–1848), a Congressman from Pennsylvania, and Catherine Carmichael (1774–1853). He had one brother, David Jenkins (1800–1850), and six sisters, Elizabeth Jenkins (1803–1870), Mary Jenkins (1805–1859), Martha Jenkins (1805–1890), Phoebe Ann Jenkins (1807–1872), Catharine Jenkins (1812–1886), and Sarah Jenkins (1817-unknown).

He graduated from Dickinson College in Carlisle, Pennsylvania and received a Doctorate in Medicine from the Medical School at the University of Pennsylvania in Philadelphia in 1833.

Career
He moved to the Wilkinson County, Mississippi to take over the medical practise of his uncle, John Flavel Carmichael (unknown-1837), a medical doctor and plantation owner who had become blind.

He owned several plantations in the Natchez District, some of which he inherited, some of which he purchased and developed. For example, he owned the Cold Spring Plantation in Pinckneyville, Mississippi. Additionally, he owned several other plantations like the Stock Farm Plantation near Nesbit, Mississippi in DeSoto County, Mississippi, the Tarbert Plantation in Wilkinson County, Mississippi, and another plantation in West Feliciana Parish, Louisiana.

A horticulturalist, he would use his Natchez residence, Elgin, as a plant nursery for different varieties of fruit trees and cotton he would later use on other plantations. He also produced hybrid species of orchids. Additionally, he was a wine connoisseur and collector of wine vintages. He was a member of the Academy of Natural Sciences, the Historical Society of Pennsylvania and the American Pomological Society. He kept a diary from 1841 to 1855.

He was a proponent of slavery, both as an economic necessity and a constitutional right.

Personal life
In 1839, he married Annis (Field Dunbar) Jenkins (1820–1855), the daughter of Dr. William Dunbar (1793–1847) and granddaughter of Sir William Dunbar (1750–1810), of the Forest Plantation near Natchez, Mississippi. They resided at Elgin in Natchez. They had four children:
Alice Dunbar Jenkins (1841–1929).
Mary Dunbar Jenkins (1843–1927). 
Captain John Flavel Jenkins (1846–1927). He served in the Confederate States Army and married Helen Louisa Winchester (1849–1917) of The Elms in Natchez.
Major William Dunbar Jenkins (1849–1914).

Death
He died of yellow fever on October 14, 1855 in Natchez.

References

Further reading
Harrell, Laura D. S.. His own vine and fig tree;: A nineteenth century botanist, John Carmichael Jenkins, M.D. Reminder. 1966. 22 pages.
Seal, Albert G.. 'John Carmichael Jenkins, Scientific Planter of Natchez District'. Journal of Mississippi History. I (1939):14–28.

1809 births
1855 deaths
People from Lancaster County, Pennsylvania
People from Natchez, Mississippi
Dickinson College alumni
Perelman School of Medicine at the University of Pennsylvania alumni
Physicians from Mississippi
American planters
American horticulturists
American proslavery activists
American diarists
Deaths from yellow fever
19th-century diarists